Western Music is a Will Oldham EP released on Spanish record label Acuarela Ovni. The EP also features Mick Turner and Jim White of Australian band Dirty Three.

Track listing
"Always Bathing in the Evening" – 3:28
"Western Song for J.LL." – 3:31
"Three Photographs" – 1:49
"Jump In Jump In, Come In Come In " – 2:59

References

1997 EPs
Will Oldham albums